Dragan Ivanov may refer to:
 Dragán Ivanov, Hungarian athlete
 Dragan Ivanov (footballer), Macedonian footballer